Adnan Golubović (born 22 July 1995) is a Slovenian professional footballer who plays as a goalkeeper for Koper.

Club career
Golubović made his Slovenian PrvaLiga debut for Domžale on 21 May 2016 in a game against Krško. On 6 November 2018, he was released from his Catanzaro contract by mutual consent. On 2 July 2019, he then signed with Serie C club Vis Pesaro for one year, with the club holding an option to extend the contract for another year.

On 11 January 2020, Golubović was loaned out to Bosnian Premier League club Sloboda Tuzla. In July 2020, he permanently joined Sloboda. In May 2021, Golubović left the Bosnian club.

Career statistics

Club

Honours
Domžale
Slovenian Cup: 2016–17

References

External links
Adnan Golubović at Sofascore

1995 births
Living people
Footballers from Ljubljana
Slovenian footballers
Association football goalkeepers
Slovenian expatriate footballers
Expatriate footballers in Italy
Slovenian expatriate sportspeople in Italy
Slovenia youth international footballers
Slovenian Second League players 
Slovenian PrvaLiga players
Serie C players
Premier League of Bosnia and Herzegovina players
NK Triglav Kranj players
NK Domžale players
Matera Calcio players
U.S. Catanzaro 1929 players
Vis Pesaro dal 1898 players
FK Sloboda Tuzla players
Expatriate footballers in Bosnia and Herzegovina